Carlos Giménez or Carlos Gimenez may refer to:

Carlos A. Giménez (born 1954), member of the United States House of Representatives
Carlos E. Giménez (born 1959), former governor of the Yaracuy State, Venezuela
Carlos Giménez (cyclist) (born 1995), a Venezuelan cyclist
Carlos Giménez (comics) (born 1941), Spanish comics artist
Carlos Romero Giménez (1890–1978), Spanish Republican officer and French Resistance member